Charles Thelluson Gellatly (18 April 1910 – 10 November 1973) was an English professional footballer who played as a left-back.

Gellatly was born in Brodsworth. He played for Halifax Town, Leicester City and Gillingham between 1928 and 1934.

References

1910 births
1973 deaths
Footballers from South Yorkshire
English footballers
Shirebrook Miners Welfare F.C. players
Halifax Town A.F.C. players
Leicester City F.C. players
Gillingham F.C. players
Association football fullbacks